Stephen Warren Mendryk (October 1, 1928 – November 17, 2011) was a Canadian football player who played for the Edmonton Eskimos. He won the Grey Cup with them in 1954, 1955 and 1956. Born and raised in Edmonton, Alberta, he previously attended and played football at the University of Alberta. Mendryk was later a professor at the University of Alberta, attending the University of California, Berkeley, and University of Oregon for his Ph.D.. He died of congestive heart failure in 2011.

References

1928 births
2011 deaths
Alberta Golden Bears football players
Edmonton Elks players
Players of Canadian football from Alberta
Canadian football people from Edmonton